Diana is a region in Madagascar at the northern part of the island. It borders the regions of Sava to the southeast and Sofia to the southwest. It covers an area of 19,266 km2, and had a population of 889,736 in 2018. The regional capital is Antsiranana (previously known as Diego Suarez).

Geography

Rivers
The main rivers of the Diana region are:

 Besokatra River
 Irodo River
 Loky River
 Mahavavy River
 Ramena River
 Saharenana River
 Sambirano River

Protected areas and visitors' attractions
The following national parks, reserves and visitors' attractions are located in Diana:
Ambodivahibe New Protected Area
Andrafiamena Andavakoera New Protected Area
Nosy Antsoha New Protected Area
Ampasindava New Protected Area
Galoko Kalobinono New Protected Area
Oronjia New Protected Area
 Amber Mountain National Park
 Analamerana Reserve
 Ankarana Reserve
 Lokobe National Park
 Manongarivo Reserve
 Tsaratanana National Park
Nosy Hara National Park
Nosy Tanikely National Park
Ambohitr'Antsingy (Montagne des Français) New Protected Area
Ankarea New Protected Area
Ankivonjy New Protected Area
Part of COMATSA Avaratra New Protected Area
Part of COMATSA Atsimo New Protected Area
 Tsingy Rouge

Administrative divisions
Diana Region is divided into five districts, which are subdivided into 51 communes. The districts are listed below with their 2013 populations:

 Ambanja District - 18 communes; 190,435 inhabitants
 Ambilobe District - 15 communes; 216,145 inhabitants
 Antsiranana I District 1 commune; 115,015 inhabitants; the city of Antsiranana
 Antsiranana II District  - 16 communes; 105,416 inhabitants; the rural area surrounding the city
 Nosy Be District 1 commune; 73,010 inhabitants; the island of Nosy Be

Transport
 Seaports in Antsiranana and Nosy Be
 2 regional airports, Antsiranana Airport and Nosy Be Airport
 2 local airports in Ambanja and Ambilobe
 The region is crossed by the paved Route Nationale 6 (Antsiranana - Ambilobe - Ambanja) and the unpaved Route Nationale 5a from Ambilobe to Iharana.

Economy

Fishery
Antsiranana is an important tuna fishing port. There is also a tuna canning factory. Other important fishery products are shrimp (2.813.291 kg exported in 2002) and sea cucumber.

Agriculture
The main crops are:
 subsistence agriculture: 75.510 ha (67% of the cultivated area): rice, manioc, corn, beans, sweet potato and potato
 cash crops: 21.560 ha (19% of the cultivated area): coffee, pepper, cacao and vanilla
 industrial crops: 15.420 ha (13% of the cultivated area): sugar cane, peanuts and cotton

There are also important productions of essential oils (mainly ylang ylang but also palmarosa, vetyver and basil) on 2465 ha in the regions of Nosy Be and Ambanja.

Cattle raising: in 2002 the region contained 308.530 bovines,  53.980 swine, 2.840 sheep and 44.520 goats.

Mining
Pozzolana, lime, gold, sapphire, graphite, lead, zinc, corundum, amethyst, garnet, zircon, cordierite, quartz, beryl and ilmenite are extracted in the region.
Ampasindava mine, a rare earth mine.

References

 EDBM

External links
 Monographie de la Région Diana

External links
 Official website of Diana Region

 
Regions of Madagascar